Taillevent is a restaurant in Paris, founded in 1946 by André Vrinat, and now owned by the Gardinier family.

Origin
The restaurant was named in a tribute to Guillaume Tirel, called Taillevent, a cook in the 14th century known to have written the first cuisine book in French, Le Viandier, ordered by Charles V of France.

History
In 1946 Taillevent restaurant was founded by André Vrinat in a dining room of the Worms, located at Saint-Georges street, 9th arrondissement of Paris; the chef was then Paul Cosnier.

In 1948, it won its first star given by the French restaurant guide Guide Michelin. In 1950, the restaurant moved to the mansion of the Duc de Morny, built in 1852, which was a family house before becoming the embassy of Paraguay. Today the restaurant is located at 15, Lamennais Street, in the 8th arrondissement of Paris.

In 1954 Taillevent restaurant received its second star under the chef Lucien Leheu. Jean-Claude Vrinat, son of the founder and a graduate of HEC Paris, began working there in 1962. In 1973, Guide Michelin awarded three stars to Taillevent restaurant, under the direction of the chef Claude Deligne.

The restaurant pastry chefs have included Philippe Feret from Brasserie Julien.

The chef Philippe Legendre began working at Taillevent in 1991.

Since 1984, Taillevent has been a recipient of the Wine Spectator Grand Award.

Diversification

In 1987, Taillevent opened a wine shop, Les Caves Taillevent, at 199 Faubourg Saint-Honoré in Paris. This wine shop was under the direction of Valérine Vrinat, who began to work for Taillevent the same year. It has since been moved to n° 228 in the same street.

In 2001, Taillevent's owners opened another restaurant, L'Angle du Faubourg, located at 195 Faubourg Saint-Honoré. Michel del Burgo left Taillevent's kitchens to lead L'Angle du Faubourg, and was replaced by head chef Alain Solivérès. Alain Lecomte became head pastry cook. This restaurant has since been renamed Les 110 de Taillevent.

In 2004, Jean-Claude Vrinat decorated the restaurant with contemporary art, and in 2005 Les Caves Taillevent opened a second wine shop at Marunouchi, Tokyo in Japan.

In June 2006 Jean-Claude Vrinat launched a blog in order to share his art-of-cooking experiences. The same year, a third wine shop, Les Caves Taillevent, opened in Printemps Haussmann, Paris.

In 2013, Les Caves de Taillevent opened its first Middle Eastern branch in Beirut, Lebanon, in Les Jardins de Tabaris.

After Alain Lecomte left Taillevent, Arnaud Vodounou became the new head pastry cook.

Troubles
On 21 February 2007, Jean-Claude Vrinat announced on his blog the loss of the third star, which was also referred to in the International Herald Tribune newspaper. Vrinat died of lung cancer on 7 January 2008. He was 71 years old.

List of chefs at Taillevent restaurant
(2021-today) Giuliano Sperandio
(2020-2021) Jocelyn Herland
(2018-2020) David Bizet
(2002-2018) Alain Solivérès
(2001-2002) Michel del Burgo
(1991-1999) Philippe Legendre 
(1970-1991) Claude Deligne
(1950-1970) Lucien Leheu
(1946-1950) Paul Cosnier

Notes

References
Taillevent official website
A review of Taillevent by New York Times newspaper
A review "60 years birthday of Taillevent restaurant" by l'Internaute (fr)
A review of Taillevent by Intelligent Life

External links

Taillevent official website

Restaurants in Paris
Michelin Guide starred restaurants in France
Restaurants established in 1946
Buildings and structures in the 8th arrondissement of Paris
French companies established in 1946